Plachawy may refer to the following places in Poland:
Pląchawy, Warmian-Masurian Voivodeship (north Poland)
Płąchawy, Kuyavian-Pomeranian Voivodeship (north-central Poland)